Natalia Dorota Partyka (born 27 July 1989) is a Polish table tennis player. Born without a right hand and forearm, she participates in competitions for able-bodied athletes as well as in competitions for athletes with disabilities. Partyka reached the last 32 of the London 2012 Olympic women's table tennis.

Early life 
Partyka began playing table tennis at the age of one to seven years. She won her first international table tennis medal in 1999 at the disabled World Championships. At the age of 11, when she competed at the 2000 Summer Paralympics in Sydney, she became the world's youngest ever Paralympian. In 2004, she won a gold medal in the singles event and silver in the team event at the Athens Paralympics. Also in 2004, she won two gold medals at the International Table Tennis Federation's European Championships for Cadets, which was open to able-bodied competitors. In 2006, Partyka won three gold medals at the European Paralympic Championships, one gold and two silvers at the International Paralympic Committee's Table Tennis World Championships for Disabled, and a silver in the team event at the ITTF European Junior Championship. She also won two silver medals and one bronze at the 2007 edition of that competition. Also in 2007, Partyka won three gold medals at the European Paralympic Championships, and a bronze at the ITTF World Junior Teams Championships.

Olympics and Paralympics performance 
Partyka competed for Poland both the 2008 Summer Olympics and the 2008 Summer Paralympics in Beijing – one of only two athletes to do so, the other being Natalie du Toit in swimming. They were her third Paralympic Games, and her first Olympics. Competing in class 10 at the Beijing Paralympics, she won gold by defeating China's Fan Lei by three sets to nil.

In 2008, she won a gold medal in the singles event and a silver in the team event at the Beijing Paralympics, repeating her Athens Paralympics result.

She competed at the 2012 Summer Olympics and 2012 Summer Paralympics in London. In the Olympics, she competed in women's singles table tennis. On 3 September 2012 Partyka defeated China's Qiang Yang 3–2 in the gold medal match to become Paralympic champion. On 8 September 2012 she won bronze in the women's team class 6–10, after defeating France 3–2.

At the 2016 Summer Olympics she competed in the women's team event and later won her fourth consecutive Paralympic singles gold medal at the 2016 Summer Paralympics.

Awards and recognitions
For her sport achievements, Partyka received:
 Knight's Cross of the Order of Polonia Restituta (5th class) in 2008
 Officer's Cross of the Order of Polonia Restituta (4th class) in 2013

See also
List of athletes who have competed in the Paralympics and Olympics
 Natalie du Toit

References

External links
 Natalia Partyka International Table Tennis Federation
 Zawodnik: Natalia Partyka Tenis Stołowy Ping Pong - Official profile, Polish Table Tennis Magazine 
 Natalia Partyka, Official website 
 PARTYKA Natalia (POL) ITTF Database

1989 births
Polish female table tennis players
Table tennis players at the 2008 Summer Olympics
Table tennis players at the 2012 Summer Olympics
Table tennis players at the 2016 Summer Olympics
Olympic table tennis players of Poland
Table tennis players at the 2000 Summer Paralympics
Table tennis players at the 2004 Summer Paralympics
Table tennis players at the 2008 Summer Paralympics
Table tennis players at the 2012 Summer Paralympics
Paralympic table tennis players of Poland
Medalists at the 2004 Summer Paralympics
Medalists at the 2008 Summer Paralympics
Medalists at the 2012 Summer Paralympics
Medalists at the 2016 Summer Paralympics
Paralympic medalists in table tennis
Paralympic gold medalists for Poland
Paralympic silver medalists for Poland
Knights of the Order of Polonia Restituta
Sportspeople from Gdańsk
Living people
Table tennis players at the 2015 European Games
Paralympic bronze medalists for Poland
Table tennis players at the 2019 European Games
European Games medalists in table tennis
European Games bronze medalists for Poland
Table tennis players at the 2020 Summer Olympics
Table tennis players at the 2020 Summer Paralympics
20th-century Polish women
21st-century Polish women